Suillellus adonis is a species of bolete fungus described from Croatia. Originally described as a species of Boletus in 2002, it was transferred to Suillellus in 2014, based on melacular phylogenetic data. This apparently rare fungus is so far known only from the islands of Cres and Cyprus.

References

External links

adonis
Fungi described in 2002
Fungi of Europe